Fulljames is a surname.

People
 John Fulljames (b. 1976), English opera director
 Reginald Fulljames (1896–1985), English cricketer and officer in Royal Flying Corps (RFC) and Royal Air Force (RAF)
 Thomas Fulljames (1808–1874), English architect
 William Fulljames (1888–1959), English association football player

English-language surnames